Luca Coccolo (born 23 February 1998) is an Italian professional footballer who plays as defender for  club Cesena.

Club career
On 26 January 2021, Coccolo joined Cremonese on loan. On 23 June 2021, he moved to SPAL on loan. On 13 January 2022, he moved on a new loan to Alessandria.

Honours 
Juventus U23
 Coppa Italia Serie C: 2019–20

References

External links
 

1998 births
Living people
Association football defenders
Italian footballers
Italy youth international footballers
Juventus F.C. players
Juventus Next Gen players
A.C. Perugia Calcio players
A.C. Prato players
U.S. Cremonese players
Cesena F.C. players
Serie C players
S.P.A.L. players
Serie B players
U.S. Alessandria Calcio 1912 players